Darr: A Violent Love Story ( Fear) is a 1993 Indian Hindi-language psychological thriller film directed and produced by Yash Chopra under his banner Yash Raj Films. The film stars Sunny Deol, Juhi Chawla and Shah Rukh Khan with Annu Kapoor, Tanvi Azmi and Anupam Kher in supporting roles, and Dalip Tahil in a special appearance.

Darr released on 24 December 1993, coinciding with the Christmas weekend, and was a major commercial success and declared a blockbuster at the box-office, and was the third-highest grossing film of the year in India, and the highest-grossing Indian film of the year in the overseas markets. It received highly positive reviews from critics upon release, with praise for the direction, screenplay, soundtrack, cinematography, costumes and the performances of the cast, with particular praise directed towards Chawla and Khan's performances.

For Chawla, this was her fourth consecutive box-office hit of the year, thus solidifying her career as a leading lady in the 1990s. Khan's portrayal of an obsessive lover, was applauded by critics and the audiences alike.

Darr has won several accolades, including the National Film Award for Best Popular Film Providing Wholesome Entertainment at the 41st National Film Awards. The film received 10 nominations at the 39th Filmfare Awards, including Best Film, Best Director (Chopra), and Best Villain (Khan), and won 2 awards, including Best Comedian (Kher).

Plot 
Kiran Awasthi, a beautiful college student returns home to her brother Vijay and his wife Poonam. She is being obsessively stalked along the way by Rahul Mehra, her classmate who is in unrequited love with her. Kiran is in love with Sunil Malhotra, an Indian Navy Officer. His captain Avinash Mehra is Rahul's father.

Rahul tries to be friendly with Sunil, to be closer to Kiran. When she reaches home, Rahul continually calls her and tells her to stay away from Sunil but while scared, she refuses to allow a stalker to order her around. He visits her both on her birthday and on Holi, terrifying her and her family.  Vijay and Poonam get Kiran and Sunil engaged, believing that the stalker would never trouble Kiran again.

Upon knowing this, an enraged Rahul tries to kill Sunil but fails. Sunil meets with an accident when chasing the stalker who he doesn't know is Rahul and is hospitalized. Kiran, who now fears for her lover's safety, decides to leave the city so her stalker will not hurt him anymore but is caught by Sunil, who marries her that night itself. Rahul is absolutely furious at this and swears to claim Kiran for himself. He trashes the couple's new house by writing "Shaadi mubarak Kiran"(Congrats on your marriage, Kiran) and "Tum meri ho Kiran"(You are mine, Kiran) and kills the police officers sent to protect the couple.

Kiran is horrified by this and fears that she might go insane. To distract her and calm her, Sunil takes Kiran on a honeymoon to Switzerland while booking extra tickets to Goa so the stalker misunderstands that the couple is in Goa and goes there instead. Rahul falls for the trick and searches all over Goa but to no avail. Instead, he finds his college friend Vikram "Vicky" Oberoi who is suffering from a disease. Rahul then tries to befriend Kiran's brother and sister-in-law by visiting them daily to try and find out about Kiran's location.

Rahul gets a call from Vicky asking him to come to see him. When he does, he finds him on his deathbed, asking Rahul to kill him as he cannot take the pain anymore. He hesitates a bit but then kills his friend and makes it look like he was the stalker. Kiran's family assumes that the stalker killed himself after not being able to track Kiran down and relax. They slip out her actual location to Rahul and he turns up at her hotel.

Kiran and Sunil recognize and welcome him to be part of their festivities. Sunil then finds out Rahul was Kiran's stalker all along. He sends her away on a boat and confronts and beats up Rahul who begs for mercy. Sunil hesitates, and Rahul stabs Sunil and leaves him to die. Rahul reaches the boat and tries to force Kiran to marry him and tells her that Sunil is dead. He gives her his mother's old saree and tells her to wear it, ignoring her begs and pleas.

Kiran locks herself in a room in the boat and when the door is broken down and she is pulled back out, it is revealed that Sunil didn't actually die and comes back to save Kiran. He and Rahul get into a fight and Rahul is killed by Sunil. Kiran and Sunil return to India and reunite with their family.

Cast 
Sunny Deol as Sunil Malhotra
Juhi Chawla as Kiran Awasthi
Shah Rukh Khan as Rahul Mehra
Annu Kapoor as Vikram "Vicky" Oberoi, Rahul's friend
Tanvi Azmi as Poonam Awasti, Kiran's sister-in-law
Dalip Tahil as Avinash Mehra, Rahul's father and Sunil's superior in the Indian Navy (special appearance)
Anupam Kher as Vijay Awasti, Kiran's brother
Raj Hans
Neena Softa
Piloo J. Wadia as the irritating hotel manager
Vikas Anand as the psychiatrist

Production 
Sridevi, who had previously worked with Chopra in Chandni (1989) and Lamhe (1991), was the original choice for the role of Kiran. The role was crafted and planned much like her previous roles in Chandni and Lamhe. Chopra too admitted dressing Kiran like Chandni and Pallavi/Pooja, which can be observed in the film as well. However, Sridevi refused to accept the role, as she wanted Kiran's character to be the obsessed lover instead of the victim, but Chopra refused this change of plot. After Sridevi, the role went to Madhuri Dixit who also chose to decline the role. Then Divya Bharti was finalized.

Sanjay Dutt was the original choice of the role of antagonist Rahul, but Chopra was unable to finalize him because of his jail sentence due to illegal possession of arms. Sudesh Berry was then considered for the role, but was rejected after a screen test. Ajay Devgn was offered the role of Rahul, but he could not accept due to other commitments.

Aamir Khan, who had worked with Chopra on Parampara (1993), was then signed as Rahul. Chopra reportedly replaced Bharti with Juhi Chawla at Khan's request. However, problems arose when Khan asked Chopra for a joint narration of the script with him and Sunny Deol. Khan's reasoning for this was that since he and Deol were two leading actors, they could hear their roles and if they were both satisfied, no ego hassles would happen henceforth. However, Chopra refused to heed to such a request. Khan was also unhappy with the way Deol's character beat Rahul up in the film's climax. Khan was then removed from the project. Ironically, after the release of the film, Deol was miffed as he felt that the other male lead role was stronger than his, thus pledging to never work with Chopra and his banner again.

After Aamir Khan left the film, Shah Rukh Khan was cast as Rahul. Darr ended up catapulting him to stardom, and he went on to star in all of Chopra's future directorial ventures.

Rishi Kapoor, Mithun Chakraborty and Jackie Shroff were all offered the role of Sunil, but they all refused. Nitish Bharadwaj was then approached for Sunil's role, due to his popularity as Lord Krishna's role in B. R. Chopra's Mahabharat. Bharadwaj however rejected the role claiming that the role was not challenging enough.

Post his refusal, the role was offered to Sunny Deol. Initially, writer Honey Irani requested Deol to play the antagonist. However, Deol refused to play a negative character due to the career risk involved with it, and hence ended up playing the role of Sunil.

The film's title Darr was suggested to Chopra by his younger son Uday Chopra and actor Hrithik Roshan.

Soundtrack 
The soundtrack for Darr was composed by the duo Shiv-Hari (Shiv Kumar Sharma and Hariprasad Chaurasia) and written by Anand Bakshi.

It was the second best-selling Bollywood soundtrack album of the year, being surpassed only by Baazigar (which also starred Khan). The soundtrack album sold about 4.5million units in India, earning at least . Rakesh Budhu of Planet Bollywood in his review gave the album 8.5 stars out of 10.

Box office 
At the domestic Indian box office, Darr became the third highest-grossing film of 1993, after Aankhen and Khalnayak, and was declared a blockbuster. In India, it was released on 190 screens, with 19.96million tickets sold. Its domestic gross was 15.73crore, including a net income of 10.74crore, which is equivalent to  when adjusted for inflation. Its domestic gross is equivalent to  when adjusted for inflation.

At the overseas box office, Darr was the year's highest-grossing Indian film of 1993, grossing $500,000 (5.58crore). Worldwide, it grossed , equivalent to  when adjusted for inflation.

Awards

Remakes 
Darr was remade in Kannada as Preethse, starring Upendra as Chandu (Rahul) Shiva Rajkumar as Surya (Sunil) and Bollywood actress Sonali Bendre playing Kiran. The film also partially inspired the 2005 Tamil film Chinna.. The Telugu film Tapassu also borrowed some scenes from Darr.

The teaser trailer for an intended five-part web series Darr 2.0 was released on YouTube on August 30, 2016. It was set to be a retelling of the film in a contemporary setting, portraying cyber-stalking and digital crimes. The web series was set to be produced by Ashish Chopra under the banner of Y-Films and directed by Vikash Chandra. Screenplay and dialogues are by Nikhil Taneja and Shubham Yogi. The series was later postponed.

Notes

References

Further reading

External links 
 

1993 films
1990s Hindi-language films
1990s psychological thriller films
1990s chase films
1990s romantic thriller films
Films scored by Shiv-Hari
Films directed by Yash Chopra
Hindi films remade in other languages
Indian romantic thriller films
Indian psychological thriller films
Indian chase films
Yash Raj Films films
Best Popular Film Providing Wholesome Entertainment National Film Award winners
Films shot in Switzerland
Films about fear
Films about stalking
Home invasions in film
Murder in films
Films set in Switzerland